Jean-Pascal Tricoire (born 1963) is a French business executive. Since 2006, Tricoire has been serving as chairman and CEO of Schneider Electric.

Early life and education 
Born in the West of France, Tricoire holds a degree in Electronic Engineering from École supérieure d'électronique de l'Ouest and an MBA from  Emlyon Business School.

Career

Early career 
After working at Alcatel, Schlumberger and Saint-Gobain between 1985 and 1986, Tricoire joined Merlin Gerin in 1986. In 1992, Merlin Gerin was acquired by Schneider Electric.

From 1988 to 1999, Tricoire developed the company's activity abroad, working in Italy for five years (1989-1994). Then, he worked in China for other five years (1994-1999) before managing operations in South Africa.

He then served in corporate functions as Head of Schneider Electric's Global Strategic Accounts and of the Schneider 2000+ program. From January 2002 to the end of 2003, he became Executive Vice President of the International Division, covering the company's business outside of North America and Europe.

In October 2003, he was appointed Deputy CEO and COO of Schneider Electric.

Leadership of Schneider Electric 

In May 2006, he became president and CEO of the management board of Schneider Electric SA.

In May 2013, Tricoire was appointed Chairman and CEO of Schneider Electric, following a change in the governance of the company, and was re-elected to the position on April 25, 2017.

Boards and organizations

Tricoire is a director of the worldwide board of the UN Global Compact and was President of the Global Compact France from 2014 to 2019.

Tricoire also represents Schneider as a UN HeForShe Corporate IMPACT champion working with other heads of state, universities and companies to advance gender equality. Under his leadership, Schneider has gone from 3% representation of women in leadership 15 years ago, to 20% representation today, with a goal to make that at least 30% by 2020.

Since 2019, he has been a member of the International Business Council of the World Economic Forum.

Tricoire is the co-chair of the Sino-French Business Council, created by France President Emmanuel Macron and China President Xi Jinping, in January 2018. He sits on the Global CEO Council to the Chinese President and Premier since 2014.

Tricoire is a member of the International Business Advisory Board of the Mayors of Beijing and Shanghai, and was also a member of the Chong Qing Mayor's International Economic Advisory Council from 2012 to 2015. He was co-chair of the China Development Forum in 2015.

He is a member of the International Advisory Council of the Singapore Economic Development Board (EDB).

He has represented Schneider Electric in Russia's Foreign Investment Advisory Council (FIAC).

He has been Director and co-founder of the Alliance for Societas Europaea Promotion since 2014.

He has been member of the board of director of Qualcomm since 2020.

Recognition 

In 2019, Jean-Pascal Tricoire was named one of the top 100 Top Performing Chief Executives by the Harvard Business Review (HBR), ranking at #48. The list analyzes companies listed in the S&P Global 1200, based on financial data, total shareholder return, and change in market capitalization.

In 2007, Tricoire became a Knight of the Order of the Legion of Honour (Chevalier de la Légion d’Honneur).

Personal life
Jean-Pascal Tricoire is married and has three children.

Tricoire is a fan of whitewater sports and outdoor sports.

Tricoire is a supporter of sustainable development. and gender equality.

Tricoire speaks French, English, Italian and Chinese.

External links 
 Schneider Electric
 Davos 2019 & 2020 panels
 Jean-Pascal Tricoire Blogs

References

1963 births
Living people
French chief executives
Emlyon Business School alumni
Schneider Electric people